The Laird of Torloisk was the hereditary owner of an estate on the Isle of Mull:
Lachlan Og Maclean, 1st Laird of Torloisk
Hector Maclean, 2nd Laird of Torloisk
Lachlan Maclean, 3rd Laird of Torloisk
Alexander Maclean, 4th Laird of Torloisk (1690-1715), was captain in the Second battalion of the Scots Guards, and served in the Spanish wars; at age twenty-five, he had his leg broken at the Battle of Brihuega, in Spain, in 1710, by a musket ball, of which he fevered and died; dying without children, he was succeeded by his cousin
Donald Maclean, 5th Laird of Torloisk 
Hector Maclean, 6th Laird of Torloisk never married, and on his death in Glasgow on May 29, 1765, he was succeeded by his immediate younger brother
Lachlan Maclean, 7th Laird of Torloisk

See also
Torloisk House
Allan Maclean of Torloisk

 
Torloisk
Baronies in the Baronage of Scotland